Gijow (also Romanized as Gījow and Gījū) is a village in Kharajgil Rural District, Asalem District, Talesh County, Gilan Province, Iran. As of the 2006 census, its population was 845, grouped into 184 families.

References 

Populated places in Talesh County